Srđan Mijailović (born 10 November 1993) is a Serbian football player who plays for Red Star Belgrade. His primary positions are attacking midfielder or defensive midfielder. Head coach Robert Prosinečki affectionately referred to him as Mićko.

Club career
In a short time he showed his potential and he became a first team player at the age of 17. He began playing football as a defensive midfielder.

On 8 February 2017 he signed a contract with Russian club Krylia Sovetov Samara. On 22 February 2019 Krylia Sovetov removed him from their roster. He was added back to Krylia's squad on 8 July 2019.

On 24 May 2020, Krylia Sovetov announced that his contract (that was set to expire on 31 May) will not be extended.

International career
On 31 May 2012, he debuted for Serbia in a friendly match against France at the age of 18.

Honours
Red Star
Serbian Cup (1): 2011–12

References

External links
 
 Profile at Serbian national team page
 Srđan Mijailović Stats at Utakmica.rs

1993 births
Living people
People from Požega, Serbia
Serbian footballers
Association football midfielders
Serbia international footballers
Serbia youth international footballers
Serbia under-21 international footballers
Red Star Belgrade footballers
Serbian SuperLiga players
Kayserispor footballers
Süper Lig players
Serbian expatriate footballers
Expatriate footballers in Turkey
Serbian expatriate sportspeople in Turkey
PFC Krylia Sovetov Samara players
Russian Premier League players
Expatriate footballers in Russia
FK Čukarički players